Lord Robert Manners, later Manners-Sutton (21 February 1722 – 19 November 1762) was the second son of John Manners, 3rd Duke of Rutland by his wife the Hon. Bridget Sutton, and younger brother of the famous soldier Lord Granby, under whom he served as Lieutenant-Colonel commanding the 21st Light Dragoons.

He was a captain in the Duke of Kingston's Light Horse in 1745 and a lieutenant-colonel in the Duke of Cumberland's Dragoons in 1746–48, with whom he served in Flanders during the War of the Austrian Succession. He was then appointed Colonel commandant of the 21st Light Dragoons from 1760 to his death.
 
Becoming a courtier, he served as a Gentleman of the Bedchamber to Frederick, Prince of Wales from 1749 to 1751. He was appointed Master of the Staghounds on 26 April 1744 and Master of the Harriers from 11 April 1754 until 13 January 1756. From 6 July 1747 until his death he was one of the Members of Parliament for Nottinghamshire.

He adopted the additional surname of Sutton on succeeding to the estates of his maternal grandfather the 2nd Lord Lexinton in 1734. These included Kelham Hall, near Newark, Nottinghamshire. He died without having married, and so the estates passed to his next brother Lord George Manners, who also adopted the name Manners-Sutton.

References

36th Regiment of Foot officers
Members of the Parliament of Great Britain for English constituencies
Younger sons of dukes
1722 births
1762 deaths
R
British MPs 1747–1754
British MPs 1754–1761
British MPs 1761–1768